Olearia viscidula, commonly known as the viscid daisy bush or wallaby weed, is a species of flowering plant in the family Asteraceae and is endemic to eastern New South Wales. It is a shrub with scattered narrow elliptic or egg-shaped leaves that are paler on the lower surface, and panicles of white flowers arranged in leaf axils.

Description
The upper leaf surfaces are shiny green, while the leaf undersides are covered with pale grey fur. The stems and new growth are sometimes covered in resin. Flowering takes place from July to November, and can be profuse. The disc is cream or yellow and rays are white, the daisy-like flower heads  in diameter.

Taxonomy and naming
Viscid daisy bush was first formally described in 1858 by Ferdinand von Mueller and given the name Eurybia viscidula Fragmenta Phytographiae Australiae from material collected by Charles Moore near Goulburn. In 1867, George Bentham changed the name to Olearia viscidula in his book Flora Australiensis. The species name is Latin "slightly sticky".

Distribution and habitat
Olearia viscidula occurs in eastern New South Wales, where it is found south of the Nandewar Rangesand where it grows in tall eucalypt forest and rainforest as well as dry sclerophyll forest and woodland, on medium- or high-nutrient soils.

Ecology
This daisy bush resprouts from a lignotuber after bushfire.

Use in horticulture
Seldom seen in cultivation, O. viscidula grows in soil with good drainage in a part-shaded location. Regular pruning prevents the plant from becoming leggy. The species is frost-hardy. It can be propagated by seed or cutting.

References

viscidula
Asterales of Australia
Flora of New South Wales
Taxa named by Ferdinand von Mueller
Plants described in 1858